The 2N2907 is a commonly available PNP bipolar junction transistor used for general purpose low-power amplifying or switching applications. It is designed for low to medium current, low power, medium voltage, and can operate at moderately high speeds. This transistor was made by several manufacturers; Texas Instruments released a data sheet for their version of this part dated March 1973. An "A" suffix indicates a slightly higher breakdown voltage. These transistors have an enduring popularity with electronics hobbyists.

Specifications
It is a 0.6-ampere, 60-volt, 400-milliwatt transistor. At low frequencies, the current gain (beta) is at least 100. The 2N2907 is used in a variety of analog amplification and switching applications.

Part numbers
The 2N2907 (PNP) and 2N2222 (NPN) are complementary transistor pairs. Other types of transistors with different properties and connections have different part numbers.   The prefix of each part number varies for each physical package type.

Important: Pin arrangements for plastic 2N2907 and PN2907 are different; Collector and Emitter are swapped with respect to the flat side of the package.

See also
 2N3904
 2N3906
 2N3055
 BC108
 BC548
 KT315

References

Further reading
Historical Databooks
 Small-Signal Semiconductors Data Book, 1218 pages, 1987, Motorola.
 Semiconductor Data Book, 916 pages, 1965, Motorola.
 Transistor and Diode Data Book, 1236 pages, 1973, Texas Instruments.

External links

 Datasheet for Fairchild Semiconductor's equivalent PN2907 (PDF)

Commercial transistors
Bipolar transistors

da:2N2222-familien